{|

{{Infobox ship career
|Hide header=
|Ship name=North Star'
|Ship owner=
|Ship operator=
|Ship registry=
|Ship route=Columbia River, Okanogan River
|Ship ordered=
|Ship builder=
|Ship original cost=
|Ship yard number=
|Ship way number=
|Ship laid down= 
|Ship launched=
|Ship built=1902, at Wenatchee, Washington; rebuilt 1907
|Ship christened=
|Ship acquired=
|Ship maiden voyage=
|Ship in service=1902
|Ship out of service=1915
|Ship identification=US #130967; after reconstruction: US #204761
|Ship fate=Burned July 8, 1915 at Wenatchee, Washington
|Ship notes=reconstructed and enlarged 1907
}}

|}

North Star was a sternwheel steamboat that operated in eastern Washington from 1902 to 1904.  This vessel should not be confused with the other vessels, some of similar design, also named North Star.

Construction
The North Star was built at Wenatchee, Washington in 1902 by George Cotterell for the Columbia & Okanogan Steamboat Company, which Captain Alexander Griggs (1828-1903) was the principal owner.

OperationsNorth Star operated out of Wenatchee on the Columbia and Okanogan rivers.  On September 3, 1902, North Star was wrecked in Entiat Rapids.  The company was able to salvage the vessel.  In 1907 at Wenatchee, North Star was rebuilt and enlarged by the veteran shipwright Alexander Watson.  (Another source states that the vessel was sold to H.S. DePuy & Will Lake and renamed Enterprise, and a new vessel, also called North Star was built in 1907.  A third source states the vessel was rebuilt.)

Withdrawn from service

Settlement in the Okanogan region decreased starting in about 1910.  As a result, business declined so much that by 1915, the Columbia & Okanogan Steamboat Co. was forced to take all of its boats out of service.  The company had made arrangements to sell North Star to Captain Fred McDermott, who was considering taking the vessel further up the Columbia, to run between Pateros and Bridgeport.

Destruction by fire
The sale of North Star had not been finalized when on July 8, 1915, fire broke out on North Star when she was rafted up at Wenatchee with the rest of the company's remaining boats, the Columbia, Okanogan, and Chelan.  North Star was the outermost vessel, but the fire soon spread to the other three.  All the vessels were rapidly and completely destroyed, and although the hull of the innermost vessel, Chelan remained afloat, the damage to that vessel was beyond repair.  There was no insurance.  The Columbia & Okanogan Steamboat Co. had so little money that they were planning to use some of the proceeds of the anticipated sale of North Star to pay the insurance premiums on the remaining three vessels.  The cause of the fire was never determined.

Notes

Further reading
 Faber, Jim, Steamer's Wake -- Voyaging down the old marine highways of Puget Sound, British Columbia, and the Columbia River'', Enetai Press, Seattle, WA 1985

See also

 Steamboats of the Columbia River, Wenatchee Reach

Steamboats of Washington (state)
Steamboats of the Columbia River